Events from the year 1860 in France.

Incumbents
 Monarch – Napoleon III

Events
23 January - Cobden-Chevalier Treaty Free Trade treaty is signed between the United Kingdom and France.
9 April - Typesetter Edouard-Leon Scott de Martinville sings "Au clair de la lune" into his phonautograph, producing the world's earliest known sound recording of a song. However, it would not be converted back into audible sound until 2008.
18 October - At the end of the Second Opium War, British and French troops enter the Forbidden City in Beijing.
24 October - Convention of Peking signed by Chinese with Britain and France.

Arts and literature

Births
11 February - Rachilde, author (died 1953)
25 June - Gustave Charpentier, composer (died 1956)
16 August - Jules Laforgue, poet (died 1887)
20 August - Raymond Poincaré, statesman, five times Prime Minister of France, President of France (died 1934)
26 November – Gabrielle Petit, feminist activist, anticlerical, libertarian socialist, and newspaper editor (died 1952)

Deaths
29 January - Stéphanie de Beauharnais, consort of Karl, Grand Duke of Baden (born 1789)
14 March - Louis Antoine Jullien, conductor (born 1812)
31 March - Évariste Régis Huc, Catholic priest and traveller (born 1813)
28 May – Rosine de Chabaud-Latour, French religious thinker and translator (born 1794) 
24 June - Jérôme Bonaparte, youngest brother of Napoleon, who made him king of Westphalia (born 1784)
22 August - Alexandre-Gabriel Decamps, painter (born 1803)
3 December - Joseph Marie Élisabeth Durocher, geologist (born 1817)
17 December - Désirée Clary, wife of King Charles XIV of Sweden and a one-time fiancée of Napoleon Bonaparte (born 1777)

Full date unknown
Carron du Villards, ophthalmologist (born 1801)

References

1860s in France